Dame Diouf (born 31 March 1978) is a Senegalese retired professional footballer, who aside from three seasons with Hannover 96, spent his entire career in the lower leagues of German football.

Career 
He spent three seasons in the Bundesliga  with Hannover 96.

Personal life 
He is the older brother of El Hadji Diouf.

References

External links
 

1978 births
Living people
Senegalese footballers
Serer sportspeople
Association football defenders
US Gorée players
CO Modèle de Lomé players
Stade Rennais F.C. players
FC 08 Homburg players
SV Wilhelmshaven players
SV Werder Bremen II players
Hannover 96 players
VfL Osnabrück players
SV Wehen Wiesbaden players
VfB Hüls players
SV Arminia Hannover players
Holstein Kiel players
SV Meppen players
Bundesliga players
2. Bundesliga players